Stapelia is a genus  of low-growing, spineless, stem succulent plants, predominantly from South Africa with a few from other parts  of Africa. Several Asian and Latin American species were formerly included but they have all now been transferred to other genera. The flowers of certain species, most notably Stapelia gigantea, can reach 41 cm (16 inches) in diameter when fully open. Most Stapelia flowers are visibly hairy and generate the odor of rotten flesh when they bloom.

Description 
The hairy, oddly textured and coloured appearance of many Stapelia flowers has been claimed to resemble that of rotting meat, and this, coupled with their odour, has earned the most commonly grown members of the genus Stapelia the common name of carrion flowers.
A notable exception is the sweetly scented Stapelia flavopurpurea. Such odours serve to attract various specialist pollinators including, in the case of carrion-scented blooms, blow flies of the dipteran family Calliphoridae. They frequently lay eggs around the coronae of Stapelia flowers, convinced by the plants' deception.

Cultivation 
A handful of species are commonly cultivated as pot plants and are even used as rockery plants in countries where the climate permits. Stapelia are good container plants and can grow well under full sun and light to moderate watering. They should be planted in well-drained compost as the stems are prone to rotting if kept moist for long.

Species 

Accepted species

Species formerly included
now transferred to other genera (Angolluma, Brachystelma, Caralluma, Duvalia, Echidnopsis, Gonolobus, Gonostemon, Hoodia, Hoya, Huernia, Monolluma, Orbea, Orbeopsis, Pachycymbium, Piaranthus, Quaqua, Stapelianthus, Stisseria, Tromotriche, Tridentea, Triplosperma)

References

 
Apocynaceae genera
Flora of Africa
Succulent plants